Isabelle Cornish (born 22 July 1994) is an Australian actress. She is known for her television roles, particularly in Puberty Blues and Home and Away, and Crystal in the 2017 American television series Inhumans.

Personal life
She is the younger sister of actress Abbie Cornish. Her parents are Shelley and Barry Cornish. Isabelle has also modelled. She attended the Hunter School of the Performing Arts. Cornish is a vegetarian.

Career
From March 2012, Cornish had a recurring role in Home and Away as Christy Clarke. In early 2014, the actress filmed a drama pilot called Sea of Fire in Vancouver. In March 2017, Cornish was cast as Crystal in the Marvel comics television series Inhumans which briefly aired on the American television network ABC.

Filmography

Accolades
The actress was crowned Australia's Prettiest Vegetarian 2013 by PETA Australia.

References

External links

 

1994 births
Australian child actresses
Australian female models
Australian film actresses
Australian television actresses
Living people
People from Maitland, New South Wales
21st-century Australian actresses